Nicollet or Nicolet may refer to:

Canada
Nicolet, Quebec, the county seat of Nicolet-Yamaska Regional County Municipality
Nicolet River, Quebec, Canada

People
Aurèle Nicolet (1926–2016), Swiss flautist
Hercule Nicolet (1801–1872), Swiss lithographer and entomologist
Jean Nicolet (1598–1642), French explorer from the 17th century
Joseph Nicollet (1786–1843), French explorer from the 19th century
Philippe Nicolet (born 1953), Swiss film director

United States

Minnesota
Nicollet, Minnesota
Nicollet Avenue, a major street in Minneapolis
Nicollet County, Minnesota
Nicollet Island, in the Mississippi River north of downtown Minneapolis
Nicollet Mall, in downtown Minneapolis
Nicollet Park, former baseball stadium in Minneapolis
Nicollet Township, Nicollet County, Minnesota

Wisconsin
Nicolet Area Technical College, a technical college whose main campus is in Rhinelander Wisconsin
Nicolet High School, a public secondary school located in Glendale, Wisconsin

Other uses
Nicollet (Amtrak), a Chicago-Milwaukee train
Nicollet (crater), on the Moon
Nicolet 1080 (1971–1986), a minicomputer

See also
Chequamegon-Nicolet National Forest, a U.S. National Forest in northern Wisconsin, United States
Nicolette (disambiguation)